Lisa Rieffel (born January 12, 1975) is an American actress and singer.

Life and career 
Rieffel was born in Denville, New Jersey. As a child, she starred on Broadway and at The Kennedy Center in Raggedy Ann: The Musical Adventure. She is a founding member and lead singer of the Los Angeles-based alternative rock band Killola. The band has released three albums: Louder, Louder! (2006), I Am The Messer (2008) and Let's Get Associated (2010) as well as a live DVD/CD titled Killola: Live in Hollywood (2007).

In television, Rieffel was a series regular in The Thorns, Ann Jillian, The Trials of Rosie O'Neill, Women of the House, and Empty Nest (season 5 only). In 1998, Rieffel was an original cast member of The King of Queens during the show's first season, taking part in four of the sitcom's first six episodes before leaving the show. Some of Rieffel's other television credits include The Cosby Show, Blossom, Roseanne, Married... with Children, Party of Five, The Pretender, Dr. Quinn, Medicine Woman, Brotherly Love, and NCIS.

Her film credits include Forget Paris (1995) and Drowning Mona (2000).

Rieffel co-wrote and recorded a song entitled "So Pretty" for the 2003 film Legally Blonde 2: Red, White & Blonde; the song, however, was not featured on the soundtrack album.

In 2007, Rieffel starred in the cult-popular web-series Girltrash! created by Angela Robinson. Girltrash! was a gritty, pulp comedy-drama with a decidedly lesbian spin. The web-series co-starred Rieffel, Margaret Cho, Rose Rollins, Michelle Lombardo, Riki Lindhome, Jimmi Simpson, Mandy Musgrave, and Gabrielle Christian. The webisodic consisted of 11 installments, airing weekly via OurChart.com, a fictitious website-turned-social-network controlled by Showtime.
The feature film Girltrash: All Night Long began production in December 2009. The script was written by Angela Robinson, with Killola writing and producing the original songs for the film's musical numbers. After several postponements, Girltrash: All Night Long was finally released in January 2014.

Personal life 
Rieffel is married to Killola bassist Johnny Dunn. They have a daughter, Jolee Rose (born December 2011), who gained viral fame in May 2020 for her original song "I Wonder What's Inside Your Butthole". Rieffel and her husband have hosted their own live radio show on Monday nights via her band's website since 2007.

References

External links 
 (Killola.com)

1975 births
Actresses from New Jersey
American alternative rock musicians
American child actresses
American film actresses
American musical theatre actresses
American television actresses
American women rock singers
Living people
Singers from New Jersey
People from Denville, New Jersey
20th-century American actresses
20th-century American singers
21st-century American actresses
21st-century American singers
20th-century American women singers
GZR members
21st-century American women singers